Golden Days may refer to:

Geography
Golden Days, Alberta, a summer village in Canada

Books
Golden Days (novel), a 1986 novel by author Carolyn See
 The Golden Days, a 1972 historical novel by author Robert Neill

Music
"Golden Days" (song), a 1984 single by the pop group Bucks Fizz
Golden Days (Dave Barnes album), 2014 album by Dave Barnes
Golden Days (Brian May and Kerry Ellis album), 2017 album by Brian May and Kerry Ellis
Golden Days Radio, a community radio station based in Melbourne, Australia
"Golden Days", song from The Student Prince by Sigmund Romberg
"Golden Days", 1968 song by Sally Field
"Golden Days", 1973 song by Tom Jones
"Golden Days", 1974 song by Jack Bruce from Out of the Storm (album)
"Golden Days", 2005 song by Drake Bell from Telegraph
"Golden Days", 2006 song by The Damwells on Air Stereo
"Golden Days", 2016 song by Panic! At The Disco from Death of a Bachelor